Snakebark maples are maples belonging to the taxonomic section Acer sect. Macrantha. The section includes 18–21 species, and is restricted to eastern Asia (the eastern Himalaya east to Japan) with the exception of one species in eastern North America.

The various species of snakebark maples are most easily distinguished from other maples by their distinctive bark, smooth (at least on young trees), and usually patterned with vertical dark green to greenish-brown stripes alternating with stripes of light green, pinkish or white, sometimes with a bluish tone. Other characters include stalked buds with just one pair of scales, and flowers on arching to pendulous racemes. The samaras are small, and often numerous. They are small deciduous trees, typically 5–15 m tall, rarely to 20 m tall, fast-growing when young but soon slowing down with age, and often short-lived; they typically occur as understorey trees in mountain forests, often along streamsides.

Species
 Acer capillipes - Kyushu maple, red snakebark maple
 Acer caudatifolium
 Acer × conspicuum - snakebark maple, a garden hybrid
 Acer crataegifolium - hawthorn-leaf maple
 Acer davidii (syn. A. grosseri, A. hersii, A. laisuense) - Père David's maple, Hers's maple
 Acer forrestii 
 Acer laxiflorum 
 Acer maximowiczii - Maximowicz's snakebark maple 
 Acer metcalfii 
 Acer micranthum 
 Acer morifolium 
 Acer morrisonense (syn. A. rubescens)
 Acer pectinatum (syn. A. taronense)
 Acer pensylvanicum - striped maple, the only non-Asian species
 Acer rufinerve - redvein maple
 Acer sikkimense  (syn. A. hookeri)
 Acer tschonoskii (syn. A. komarovii)
 Acer tegmentosum 

Some have good fall color with tones of reds and orange, while others tend toward a pale yellow which is less impressive. All are relatively hardy compared to many other species of maples, and many are widely cultivated as ornamental trees for their bark. Several cultivars and hybrids have been developed in cultivation.

See also
List of Acer species

References

Maple